Mikhail Vasilyevich Frunze (2 February 1885 – 31 October 1925) was a Bolshevik leader during and just prior to the Russian Revolution of 1917. Born in the modern-day Kyrgyz Republic, he became active with the Bolsheviks and rose to the rank of a major Red Army commander in the Russian Civil War of 1917–1918. He is best known for defeating Baron Peter von Wrangel in Crimea. The capital of the Kirghiz SSR (modern Bishkek) was named in his honor from 1926 until 1991, when the Soviet Union was dissolved.

Life and political activity

Frunze was born in 1885 in Pishpek (now Bishkek in Kyrgyzstan), then a small Imperial Russian garrison town in the Kyrgyz part of Russian Turkestan (Semirechye Oblast). His father was a Bessarabian Romanian para-medic (feldsher) (originally from the Kherson Governorate) and his mother was Russian. Frunze began his higher studies at Verniy (present-day Almaty), and in 1904 he attended the Saint Petersburg Polytechnical University.
Frunze became active in the Russian Social Democratic Labour Party (RSDLP). At the Second Congress of the RSDLP in London (1903), Vladimir Lenin and Julius Martov, the two main leaders, confronted each other in an ideological split over party tactics (Martov argued for a large party of activists, whilst Lenin wanted a small group of professional revolutionaries with a large fringe group of sympathisers). Frunze at the age of 18 sided with Lenin's majority, the so-called Bolsheviks ("majoritarians"), as opposed to Martov's minority, the Mensheviks (or "minoritarians").

Two years after the Second Congress, Frunze became an important leader in the 1905 Revolution. He led striking textile workers in Shuya and Ivanovo. Following the end of the movement, Frunze was arrested in 1907 and sentenced to death; he was imprisoned and spent several months on death row awaiting his execution. His sentence was commuted to life at hard labour. After 10 years in Siberian prisons, Frunze escaped to Chita. There he became editor of the Bolshevik weekly newspaper Vostochnoe Obozrenie (Eastern Review).

During the February Revolution of 1917, Frunze headed the Minsk civilian militia before his election as president of the Byelorussian Soviet. He later went to Moscow and led an armed force of workers to aid in the struggle for control of the city.

Russian Civil War
After the October Revolution of 1917, Frunze was appointed in 1918 as Military Commissar for the Ivanovo-Voznesensk Province. In the course of the Russian Civil War of 1917–1922, he was appointed as head of the Southern Army Group of the Red Army Eastern Front (March 1919). After Frunze's troops defeated Admiral Alexander Kolchak and the White Army in Omsk, Leon Trotsky (the head of the Red Army) gave overall command of the Eastern Front to him (19 July 1919). Frunze drove out Basmachi insurgents and White Army troops from his native Turkestan. He captured Khiva in February and Bukhara in September 1920.

In November 1920, Frunze's army took the Crimea and managed to push White general Pyotr Wrangel and his troops out of Russia. As commander of the southern front, Frunze also led the destruction of Nestor Makhno's anarchist movement in Ukraine and the nationalist movement of Symon Petliura.

In December 1921, Frunze visited Ankara, during Turkish War of Independence, as an ambassador of the Ukrainian SSR, and established Turkish–Soviet relations. Mustafa Kemal Atatürk valued him as an ally and a friend, to the extent that he placed a statue of Frunze as a part of the Republic Monument at the Taksim Square, in Istanbul.

In 1921, Frunze was elected to the Central Committee of the Russian Bolshevik Party. On 2 June 1924 he became candidate member of the Politburo and in January 1925, became the Chairman of the Revolutionary Military Council.

Frunze's support of Grigory Zinoviev brought him into conflict with Joseph Stalin, one of Zinoviev's chief opponents. They had previously been on amiable terms, as Stalin had displayed respect towards his fellow "old guard" revolutionary and former prisoner.

Death

Frunze had been noted among communist leaders as possessing a very creative and almost unorthodox view on matters of implementation and policy. He gained the respect and admiration of his comrades thanks to his successful pursuit of complicated military objectives, and his endurance during the period when the Communist party was illegal. He had been considered as a potential successor to Lenin, due to his strength in both theoretical and practical matters of advancing the Communist party agenda, and his seeming lack of personal ambition separate from the party.

Frunze suffered from a chronic ulcer. Although doctors recommended surgery, he favoured more conservative treatments. After an especially severe episode in 1925, Frunze was hospitalised. Stalin and Anastas Mikoyan both came to visit him, and impressed on him the need for an operation.

Not long before his death, Frunze wrote to his wife:  "At present I am feeling absolutely healthy, and it seems ridiculous to even think of, and even more-so to undergo an operation. Nevertheless, both party representatives are requiring it."

Frunze died during surgery on 31 October 1925. Given the internecine politics, there were rumours that Stalin or another rival had secretly ordered his death. While V. Topolyansky, in his 2006 book, said there is no evidence to support this, a 26 October 2010 article in Izvestiya reported that Frunze had been administered a chloroform dose that exceeded the normal dose by sevenfold.

Frunze was buried in the Kremlin Wall Necropolis. Today his grave is one of the twelve individual tombs located between the Lenin Mausoleum and the Kremlin wall.

Legacy

In 1926, the capital city of Bishkek, Kyrgyzstan, was renamed Frunze in his honour. It reverted to its former name in 1991, after dissolution of the Soviet Union. Frunze is still commemorated in the city: his equestrian statue stands in front of the main railway station. A street and a museum in the centre of the city are named after him. In addition, the museum contains his childhood home, a cottage that was installed inside a larger modern structure.

Shuya, Ivanovo Oblast is home to another memorial museum dedicated to Frunze.

Multiple villages in Russia were named for him. Streets in many Russian cities are named after him.

The Frunze Military Academy in Moscow, one of the most respected in the former Soviet Union, was named in his honour.

The Soviet 2nd Rifle Division was formerly known as 2nd Belarusian Red Banner Rifle Division in the name of M.V. Frunze.

There are stations named Frunzenskaya in his honour on the Moscow Metro, Saint Petersburg Metro and Minsk Metro, and a stone carving of his likeness stands at one end of the station.

The Nemyshlyanskyi District of Kharkiv, Ukraine, was formerly named Frunzensky District. In 2016 it was renamed to its current name to comply with decommunization laws.

After his death, the first name for boys Frunzik (roughly "Little Frunze") became quite popular in the Caucusus and Soviet Turkestan. The most notable of these is probably Frunzik Mkrtchyan.

The Russian battleship Poltava was renamed Frunze in his honour in January 1926, as was the second Kirov-class nuclear battlecruiser (now the "Admiral Lazarev") in 1981.

General Frunze is also honoured with a place right behind Atatürk, in the Monument of the Republic, located at the heart of Taksim Square, in Istanbul, Turkey.

Frunze is remembered by some for his military doctrine. One author even ranks him next to Clausewitz.

Literary depictions

Boris Pilnyak's story "The Tale of the Unextinguished Moon" was based on Frunze's death. His death also forms the central element of the first two chapters of Vasily Aksyonov's novel Generations of Winter.

Marxist activist Tariq Ali featured Frunze in his 2017 biography of Vladimir Lenin, The Dilemmas of Lenin. Ali portrays Frunze as a significant figure in developing the military tactics of the Red Army during the civil war. He emphasizes Frunze's concept of Marxist military tactics, which strongly influenced Soviet military organization.

Quotes
"All that we do, every action, should correspond to the highest ideals of the Revolution."
"The Red Army was created by the workers and peasants and is led by the will of the working class. That will is being carried out by the united Communist Party."

References

Further reading

External links 

Frunze Museum Atlas Obscura
Frunze's writings on military theory
 

1885 births
1925 deaths
People from Bishkek
People from Semirechye Oblast
Soviet people of Russian descent
Russian people of Romanian descent
Russian Social Democratic Labour Party members
Old Bolsheviks
Politburo of the Central Committee of the Communist Party of the Soviet Union candidate members
Soviet Ministers of Defence
Russian Constituent Assembly members
Soviet generals
Military theorists
Soviet military personnel of the Russian Civil War
People of the Russian Revolution
Russian military leaders
Russian military writers
Kyrgyzstani diplomats
Ambassadors of Kyrgyzstan to Turkey
Peter the Great St. Petersburg Polytechnic University alumni
Burials at the Kremlin Wall Necropolis
Deaths from chloroform
Inmates of Vladimir Central Prison
Commandants of the Frunze Military Academy